Zygodontomys is a genus of rodent in the tribe Oryzomyini of the family Cricetidae. Its closest relative may be Scolomys. It ranges from Central America east to the Guianas. It contains two species: Zygodontomys brunneus and Zygodontomys brevicauda.

References

 
Rodent genera
Taxa named by Joel Asaph Allen
Taxonomy articles created by Polbot